Ethan Quinn (born March 12, 2004) is an American tennis player. Quinn has a career-high ATP singles ranking of No. 501 achieved on 15 August 2022 and a doubles career-high ranking of No. 736 achieved on August 8 2022.

Personal life
Quinn attended the San Joaquin Memorial High School in Fresno, California. He was an early enrolee at the University of Georgia in January 2022. He was ranked the No. 1 national tennis recruit in 2022.

Career

2022: Grand Slam debut
Quinn won the doubles at the 2022 USTA Boys 18s National Championship with his partner Nicholas Godsick which earned them a wildcard into the main draw of the 2022 US Open. They won the final with a 6–4, 6–0 defeat of Sebastian Gorzny and Alex Michelsen who had been top seeds following their 2022 Wimbledon Junior doubles victory. In the singles event at the same competition Quinn also reached the final but lost to Learner Tien in 4 sets. For reaching the final, Quinn gained a wildcard into the singles qualifying at Flushing Meadow. In the first round of the qualifying event at Flushing Meadows, Quinn defeated his higher ranked compatriot Ernesto Escobedo with a 5–7, 6–4, 6–4 victory.

Style of play
Former French Open doubles champion Luke Jensen on ESPN commentary marked the Quinn forehand with the phrase "That’s the hammer! That’s the cannon! Unleash the beast". In his US Open qualifying win over Ernesto Escobedo, Quinn was regularly hitting 120mph first serves whilst displaying a second serve that sufficiently kicked high and wide that for some it drew favourable comparisons with Quinn's compatriot John Isner.

ATP Challenger and ITF World Tennis Tour finals

Singles: 3 (2–1)

Explanatory notes

References

External links

2004 births
Living people
American male tennis players
Sportspeople from Fresno, California
Georgia Bulldogs tennis players
Tennis people from California